Roberto Bortolotto (born 15 April 1985) is an Italian footballer who plays as a forward.

Club career
Born in Padua, Veneto, Bortolotto started his career at Calcio Padova, then joined the A.C. Milan youth team. During the 2002–03 season, he played his first Serie A match for the senior side, the third last match of the season, before the 2003 UEFA Champions League Final and the 2003 Coppa Italia Final. Milan rested almost all of their regular starters during the match, and used 11 Primavera Team players on the field and on the bench. Bortolotto replaced Alessandro Matri in the 71st minute; the match ended in a 4–2 home loss to Piacenza.

In summer 2004, he joined Serie C2 side Biellese. The following season, he was signed by Chievo on a co-ownership deal. In June 2007, however, neither club wished to buy him outright, and Biellese was relegated. He then left for Serie D side Tritium, where he was re-united with his brother. Enrico Bortolotto. In June 2010, he won the Serie D Group B championship with the club, earning promotion to the Lega Pro Seconda Divisione.

International career
Bortolotto was capped for the Italy U19 side during the team's 2004 UEFA European Under-19 Football Championship qualification campaign.

References

External links
 Profile at FIGC 
 
 Tritium1908 First team profile 

1985 births
Living people
Italian footballers
Italy youth international footballers
Serie A players
Calcio Padova players
A.C. Milan players
Tritium Calcio 1908 players
U.S. Triestina Calcio 1918 players
Association football forwards
Sportspeople from Padua
A.S.D. La Biellese players
Footballers from Veneto